, or Celtic tuning is an alternative guitar tuning most associated with Celtic music, though it has also found use in rock, folk, metal and several other genres. Instead of the standard tuning the six guitar strings are tuned, from low to high, 

The result is an open D, suspended fourth chord. Being suspended, the open tuning is neither intrinsically major nor minor.

History
D A D G A D was popularized by British folk guitarist Davey Graham.

Inspired by hearing an oud player in Morocco, Graham experimented with detuning some of the guitar's strings from standard tuning, arriving at   He employed the tuning to great effect in his treatments of Celtic music, but also the folk music of India and Morocco. The first guitarists in Irish traditional music to use the tuning were Mícheál Ó Domhnaill and Dáithí Sproule; it has become a very common tuning in the genre.

Other proponents of the tuning include Roy Harper, John Martyn, Ben Howard, Andy Mckee, Russian Circles, Mike Dawes, Alejandro Aranda, Rory Gallagher, Luka Bloom, Stan Rogers, Jimmy Page (The Yardbirds' "White Summer" and Led Zeppelin's "Black Mountain Side" and "Kashmir" use this tuning), Neil Young, Artie Traum, Pierre Bensusan, Eric Roche, Midnight, Laurence Juber, Tony McManus, Stephen Wake, Bert Jansch, Richard Thompson, Dick Gaughan, Alistair Hulett, Steve von Till (along with its modified form), Imaad Wasif, Mark Kozelek, Jeff Tweedy, Masaaki Kishibe, Paul McSherry, Acle Kahney (uses a 7 string variation), Sevendust (although downtuned), Kotaro Oshio, Ben Chasny, Al Petteway, Justin Currie, Lankum and Trey Anastasio. English folk musician Martin Carthy now mostly uses a related tuning, whose evolution from  he describes explicitly in his 1987 book.

These act as a drone on either the bass or treble strings, approximating the voicings used in traditional Scottish and Irish pipe music.

See also
 List of guitar tunings

Notes

References

External links
 
 

Guitar tunings

ru:Гитарный строй#Строй «DADGAD»